The First National Bank is a historic bank building at 611 Main Street in Webster, South Dakota.  Built in 1903, it is a two-story structure, made of brick with limestone veneer.  It is an excellent local example of commercial Italianate architecture, with narrow round-arch windows with molded hood surrounds, decorative crowns above the doorways, and pilasters on the second floor.  It is also historically significant as the third bank established in Day County.

The building was listed on the National Register of Historic Places in 2005.

References

Commercial buildings completed in 1903
Bank buildings on the National Register of Historic Places in South Dakota
Buildings and structures in Day County, South Dakota
Italianate architecture in South Dakota
National Register of Historic Places in Day County, South Dakota